Kamran Khan (born 22 February 1990 in England) is a professional squash player who represented Malaysia. He reached a career-high world ranking of World No. 56 in January 2010.

He is the son to Jansher Khan, the former world No. 1 professional Pakistani squash player. His Malaysian mother divorced with his father and brought Kamran back from Pakistan to Malaysia to make a living. He is of Pashtun descent.

References

External links 
 
 

Malaysian male squash players
Living people
1990 births
Malaysian people of Pakistani descent
Malaysian people of Pashtun descent
Pashtun people